Sacsin also known as DnaJ homolog subfamily C member 29 (DNAJC29) is a protein that in humans is encoded by the SACS gene. Sacsin is a Hsp70 co-chaperone.

Function 

This gene consists of nine exons including a gigantic exon spanning more than 12.8k bp. It encodes the sacsin protein, which includes a UBQ region at the N-terminus, a HEPN domain at the C-terminus and a DnaJ region upstream of the HEPN domain. This modular protein is essential for normal mitochondrial network organization. The gene is highly expressed in the central nervous system, also found in skin, skeletal muscles and at low levels in the pancreas. Mutations in this gene result in autosomal recessive spastic ataxia of Charlevoix-Saguenay (ARSACS), a neurodegenerative disorder characterized by early-onset cerebellar ataxia with spasticity and peripheral neuropathy.

Clinical significance 

Autosomal recessive spastic ataxia of Charlevoix-Saguenay (ARSACS) is a very rare neurodegenerative genetic disorder that results from mutations in the gene that produces Sacsin. Afflicted persons suffer from loss of balance, loss of muscle control and spasticity.

References

Further reading

External links 
  GeneReviews/NCBI/NIH/UW entry on ARSACS -  Autosomal Recessive Spastic Ataxia of Charlevoix-Saguenay
  OMIM entries on ARSACS -  Autosomal Recessive Spastic Ataxia of Charlevoix-Saguenay

Co-chaperones